This is a list of Finnish language names in Norway. The first list contains all Finnish or Kven names that are officially recognised by the Norwegian Mapping and Cadastre Authority. The second lists further Finnish names of towns in the general area (most of these names do not have official status).

Kven is closely related to Finnish and was recognised as an official minority language of Norway in 2005. It is one of three official languages of Porsanger municipality in Finnmark.

Counties

Finnmark county (Finnish: Ruija)
Troms county (Finnish: Tromssa)

Other names

Aidejarvi = Aittijärvi
Alleknjarg = Allikkaniemi
Alta = Alattio
Alteidet = Tuikkanen
Amtmannes = Ariniemi
Anebakelv = Riekki 
Apaja = Apaja 
Austerbotn = Sokkuvuono
Avjovarri = Aviovaara
Badderen = Paattari 
Bæivasgiedde = Päiväskenttä
Bakfjord = Paakivuono
Bakkeby = Sokkuvuono 
Balsfjord = Paatsivuono 
Baskabut = Paskapudas 
Billefjord = Pillavuono
Bilto = Piltto 
Bognelvdalen = Paunu
Bonokas = Punakas
Brashamn = Praashamina
Brennelv = Lottijoki
Bugøynes = Pykeija
Burfjord = Puruvuono 
Båteng = Venekenttä
Bøkfjorden = Utsavuono
Børselv = Pyssyjoki
Børselvnes = Kiksiniemi
Djupvik = Siennalahti 
Ekkerøy = Ekreija
Elsnes = Juovankka 
Elvebakken = Joensuu
Elvevollen = Staaluvankka 
Furuflaten = Yykeänvankka 
Gandvik = Juurivuono
Grense Jakobselv = Vuoremijoki
Hallen = Kauppi 
Hamnnes = Karkko 
Havøya = Havöija
Helligskogen = Pyhäouta 
Hestnes = Hesteniemi
Hjelmsøya = Jälmesöija 
Holmfjord = Suoluvuono
Hysingjorden = Matinkenttä 
Høvik = Heviika
Indre Kvenby = Sisäpää
Ingøya = Inga
Jarfjorden = Rautavuono
Karasjok = Kaarasjoki
Kariel = Karieli
Karleborn = Isovuono
Karnes = Kariniemi 
Kautokeino = Koutokeino
Kiberg = Kiiperi 
Kiby = Kyypi
Kirkenes = Kirkkoniemi
Kistrand = Ryssämarkka
Kitdalen = Soiketanouta 
Kjækan = Kätkänen 
Kjæsklubben = Keisi
Kjelderen = Kellari 
Kjelmøya = Taalmain saari
Kjelvik = Kelviika 
Kjosen = Muotkalahti 
Kjø = Kiviö
Kolvik = Sarvesvuono
Komagvær = Kummaväri 
Kornes = Ristiniemi
Korsfjorden = Ristivuono
Kraknes = Nurmi 
Krampenes = Kramppinen
Kvænangen = Naavuono 
Kvænangsbotnen = Naavuononpohja 
Kvænvik = Kreeta
Kvalnes = Valasniemi 
Kvalvik = Kolsivuopio 
Kvesmenes = Vieksikenttä 
Kåfjord = Kaivuono
Laggo = Lankovuono
Lakselv = Lemmijoki
Laksnes = Lohiniemi
Langbunes = Lamppuniemi 
Langfjord = Lankovuono
Lappoluobbal = Lappjärvi
Laukvik = Lökviika 
Leirbugt = Keväsija 
Leirpollen = Jouluvuono
Leirpollen = Kenttä
Levajok = Levajoki
Loppa = Lappea
Lyngen = Yykeä 
Lyngseidet = Muotka 
Magerøya = Makaravjo
Magerøya = Makreija
Manndalen = Olmavankka 
Masjok = Maskijoki
Maursund = Maarnuora 
Maze = Maasi
Mellenfjord = Uksiviiki 
Mortensnes = Morttinen
Munkfjorden = Uutuanvuono
Måsøy = Moseija
Neiden = Näätämö
Nesseby = Uuniemi
Nordkjosen = Ryssäpahta 
Nordlenangen = Itarivuono 
Nordmannvik = Talvisvankka 
Nordnes = Norssi/Notkoniemi 
Nordreisa = Raisi 
Norskholmen = Pekansaari
Nyborg = Mäskivuono
Nyhamn = Nyyhamina
Olderdalen = Junttaniemi 
Olderfjorden = Leppivuono
Olderskogen = Leppiouta 
Opnan = Oppana
Oteren = Saukkonen 
Pollen = Voivuono 
Polmak = Pulmanki
Porsangen = Porsanginvuono
Porsanger = Porsanki
Porselven = Porsijoki
Prestelv = Sisäjoki
Rafsbotn = Rässivuono
Rasteby = Suoloniemi 
Reinøy = Renöija
Reinøya = Vassa
Reipas = Reipas
Risfjorden = Riisvuono
Rottenvik = Kuotsavuopio 
Russeluft = Ruoslahti
Rustefjelbma = Ruostevielma
Røyelelva = Roijalus 
Salttjern = Salttijärvi
Sappen = Sappi 
Seida = Lottojoki
Signaldalen = Singalanouta 
Sirma = Sirma
Sjuosjavri = Suosjärvi
Skallelv = Kallijoki
Skallenes = Kalliniemi
Skibotn = Markkina/Yykeänperä 
Skibotndalen = Yykeänvankka 
Skipagurra = Kiippakura
Skjervøy = Kierua 
Skogerøya = Saalamo
Skogfoss = Hakoköngäs
Skullnes = Kullaselva
Smalfjorden = Rautuvuono
Smørfjord = Smirvuono
Snemyren = Lumijänkkä 
Sopnes = Suppiniemi
Stjernøya = Siernöijä
Storfjord = Omasvuono 
Storslett = Hansinkenttä 
Storvik = Lahti 
Storviknes = Kalkkiniemi
Suohpajavri = Suoppajärvi
Svartfoss = Mustaniva 
Svartnes = Mustaniemi
Sørkjosen = Rässikäinen 
Talvik = Talmulahti
Tamsøya = Taumusaari/Tamsöijä
Tana = Teno
Tana bru = Tenon kylä
Tappeluft = Tappolahti
Tomaselv = Turvejoki
Transfarelva = Kaidusjoki
Tromsø = Tromssa 
Tromsøysundet = Tromssannuora 
Tverrelva = Tuorisjoki
Tørfossnes = Kuivakoski 
Ullsfjord = Moskivuono 
Vadsø = Vesisaari
Vækker = Väkkärä
Vainesbund = Vierivuono
Vardø = Vuoreija
Veibakken = Paali 
Vesterbotn = Lemmivuono
Vestre Jakobselv = Annijoki
Vinnelys = Varppi
Ytre Kvenby = Ulkojoki
Ytre Leirpollen = Piesankoppa
Øksfjord = Aksuvuono

See also
Finnish exonyms for places in Norway: Finnmark
Finnish exonyms
List of European exonyms
Lists of exonyms
Exonyms
Kven culture
Names of places in Norway